Chersomorpha is a genus of moths belonging to the subfamily Tortricinae of the family Tortricidae.

Species
Chersomorpha biocellana (Walker, 1863)
Chersomorpha hyphantria Diakonoff, 1984
Chersomorpha taospila Meyrick, 1926

See also
List of Tortricidae genera

References

External links
tortricidae.com

Phricanthini
Tortricidae genera